Juan Carlos Martín Lizarzaburu Lizarzaburu (born 20 June 1969) is a Peruvian politician. He was elected congressman of the Republic of Peru for overseas citizens for the 2021-2026 parliamentary period representing Popular Force. He is one of two politicians to represent the electoral district.

Political career
In the general elections of 2021, Lizarzaburu was elected to the Peruvian Congress for overseas citizens with Popular Force. He garnered 20,049 votes for the parliamentary period 2021-2026.

Lizarzaburu is based in Spain.

References

1969 births
Living people
Politicians from Lima
21st-century Peruvian politicians
Members of the Congress of the Republic of Peru
Fujimorista politicians
Peruvian expatriates in Spain